National Route 205 is a national highway of Japan connecting Sasebo, Nagasaki and Higashisonogi, Nagasaki in Japan, with a total length of 23.2 km (14.42 mi).

References

National highways in Japan
Roads in Nagasaki Prefecture